Unfinished Story is a 1955 Soviet drama film directed by Fridrikh Ermler.

Plot 
The local doctor Yelizaveta  Maksimovna is a beautiful woman and a wonderful sympathetic person. She is lonely, although she is cared for by a confident and promising colleague. Yelizaveta Maksimovna has one patient, a manly, full-energy ship builder  Yershov, chained to the bed with a paralysis of both legs.

All doctors recommend him rest, and Elizaveta Maksimovna advises to work and not feel sorry for herself. Yershov with all his heart falls in love with his doctor, and she loves him, but she does not dare to say her feelings, Ershov thinks that he has no hopes.

Cast
 Elina Bystritskaya as Yelizaveta Muromtseva
 Sergey Bondarchuk as Yuri Yershov
 Sofia Giatsintova as Anna Yershova, Yuri's Mother
 Yevgeny Samoylov as Aleksandr Aganin
 Yevgeni Lebedev as Fyodor Ivanovich  
 Aleksandr Larikov as Grandpa Spirin
 German Khovanov as Vasili Spirin
 Yuri Tolubeyev as Nikolai Sladkov
 Erast Garin as Koloskov
 Antonina Bogdanova as Aunt Polya
 Vladimir Voronov as Ponomaryov
 Boris Leskin as patient simulator

Release 
Fridrikh Ermler's film  watched 29.3 million viewers, which is 406 results in the history of Soviet film distribution.

References

External links 
  

1955 films
1955 drama films
Soviet drama films
Lenfilm films
Films directed by Fridrikh Ermler
Films about physicians